Hillary Jeanne Scholten (born February 22, 1982) is an American attorney and politician serving as the U.S. representative from Michigan's 3rd congressional district since 2023. She is a member of the Democratic Party.

Early life and career 
Scholten grew up in Hudsonville, Michigan. Her mother, Judi, was a principal and teacher in several Grand Rapids area schools and her father, Scott, was a sports journalist for The Grand Rapids Press. Scholten attended Unity Christian High School, and graduated from Gordon College and the University of Maryland Francis King Carey School of Law.

Scholten was a judicial law clerk and attorney adviser for the Board of Immigration Appeals from 2013 to 2017. When the Obama administration ended, she moved back to Grand Rapids and became a staff attorney for the Michigan Immigrant Rights Center.

U.S. House of Representatives

Elections

2020 

She was unopposed in the Democratic Party primary. She lost the general election to Republican nominee Peter Meijer, but came the closest a Democrat had come to winning the district since 1982, when incumbent Republican Harold S. Sawyer was held to 51% in what was then the 5th district. It was also only the second time since 1982 that a Democrat had received 40% of the vote; the Democratic nominee received 43% two years earlier.

2022 

Scholten ran again in the 2022 elections. She was again unopposed in the Democratic primary. She was initially priming for a rematch against Meijer, but Meijer lost the Republican primary to the considerably more conservative former Trump administration official John Gibbs. 

Scholten was running in a district that had been made significantly more competitive in redistricting; it had been pushed to the west to grab a large portion of the Lake Michigan shoreline, including Muskegon. Had it existed in 2020, Joe Biden would have won it with 53% of the vote; Donald Trump carried the old 3rd with 51%. Scholten (54.9%) defeated Gibbs (42%) to win election to the 118th United States Congress. She is only the second Democrat to represent Grand Rapids in Congress since 1913. The only other time it was out of Republican hands in that time was when Richard Vander Veen won a special election to succeed Gerald Ford in what was then the 5th District in 1974; he won a full term later that year but was defeated in 1976.

Caucus memberships 

 New Democrat Coalition

Committee assignments 

 Committee on Transportation and Infrastructure
 Subcommittee on Coast Guard and Maritime Transportation (vice ranking member)
 Committee on Small Business

Personal life 
Scholten's husband, Jesse Holcomb, is a journalism professor at Calvin University. They have two sons. Scholten is a member of LaGrave Christian Reformed Church.

Political positions

Abortion 
Scholten supports abortion rights. In a speech opposing the Born-Alive Abortion Survivors Protection Act, she cited Jeremiah 1:5, which states, "I knew you before I formed you and placed you in your mother's womb", a verse commonly cited by Christians "to make theological or scriptural arguments in favor of legal protections for preborn children".

Syria 
Scholten voted against H.Con.Res. 21 which directed President Joe Biden to remove U.S. troops from Syria within 180 days.

References

External links
 Congresswoman Hillary Scholten official U.S. House website
Campaign website

|-

1982 births
21st-century American politicians
21st-century American women politicians
Candidates in the 2020 United States elections
Christians from Michigan
Democratic Party members of the United States House of Representatives from Michigan
Female members of the United States House of Representatives
Gordon College (Massachusetts) alumni
Living people
Michigan Democrats
People from Hudsonville, Michigan
University of Maryland Francis King Carey School of Law alumni
Women in Michigan politics